Proline Film was founded in 2004 by Russian movie composer and producer Andrey Sigle. The Studio cooperates with independent European producers, funds, film studios and TV channels.

«The Sun» (2005) directed by Russian cinema figure Alexander Sokurov was the first Studio's project. It was the first movie in the past five years to represent Russia at the 55th International Film Festival in Berlin. In 2011 «Faust» by Alexander Sokurov won The Golden Lion at Venice Film Festival.

List of films produced by Proline Film
The Role (2013)
Arventur (2013)
I Don't Love You (2013)
Faust (2011)
The Missing Man (2010)
The Orchard (2008)
Alexandra (2007)
The Ugly Swans (2006)
Serko (2006)
The Sun (2005)

Film production companies of Russia
Companies based in Saint Petersburg